McGraw or MacGraw may refer to:
 McGraw (surname)
 McGraw, New York
 McGraw-Hill Education, a publishing and education corporation

See also
 McGrawville, New York